Sir Henry St John (1590-c.1642) was an English politician who sat in the House of Commons   between 1621 and 1625.

St John was a younger son of Oliver St John, 3rd Baron St John of Bletso and his wife Dorothy Reid, daughter  of Sir John Rede or Reid, of Odington, Gloucestershire. He was knighted on 24 July 1619 at Bletsoe together with his brother Beauchamp, MP. Apart from Beauchamp, four other brothers, Oliver, Rowland, Anthony and Alexander were to become MPs. 

In 1621 St John was elected Member of Parliament for Huntingdon. He was re-elected MP for Huntingdon in 1624 and again in 1625.

St John died without issue. His eldest brother Oliver inherited the Barony and became Earl of Bolingbroke.

References

  

1590 births
160s deaths
Knights Bachelor
English MPs 1621–1622
English MPs 1624–1625
English MPs 1625
Younger sons of barons